Robert Roberts Bishop (March 13, 1834 – October 7, 1910) was a Massachusetts lawyer and politician who served in the Massachusetts House of Representatives, as a member, and President of, the Massachusetts Senate and as an associate justice of the Massachusetts Superior Court. Bishop was also the unsuccessful Republican Party nominee in the 1882 election for governor of Massachusetts.

See also
 1874 Massachusetts legislature
 1878 Massachusetts legislature
 1880 Massachusetts legislature
 1881 Massachusetts legislature

References

1834 births
People from Medfield, Massachusetts
Politicians from Newton, Massachusetts
Phillips Academy alumni
Harvard Law School alumni
Massachusetts lawyers
Republican Party members of the Massachusetts House of Representatives
Republican Party Massachusetts state senators
Presidents of the Massachusetts Senate
Massachusetts state court judges
1910 deaths
19th-century American judges
19th-century American lawyers